Siyani (Urdu:سیانی) is a 2022 Pakistani family social television series, produced by Abdullah Kadwani and Asad Qureshi under their production banner 7th Sky Entertainment. It features Anmol Baloch, Mohsin Abbas Haider, Usama Khan and Saniya Shamshad in lead roles.

Cast
Anmol Baloch as Kiran(Deceased): a sly, selfish and arrogant girl with innocent looks, hailing from a lower middle class family, who aspires to achieve a lifestyle through taking shortcuts and building her life on lies and deception, turning into a jealous, sarcastic ruthless, sadistically scheming women married to Zarbab.
Mohsin Abbas Haider as Zarbab: a handsome young man who belongs to a wealthy and influential family. His first meeting with Kiran turns out to be magical as he falls in love at first sight.
Saniya Shamshad as Ujala: a orphaned, well-mannered, beautiful and selfless girl who is Haleema's sister living with Bakhtiyaar's family in sharing room with Kiran until Ujala gets married and still strives to become independent.
Usama Khan as Zohaib: an obedient and smart guy, Zarbab's younger brother who fall in love with Ujala.
Tipu Shareef as Bakhtiyaar: Kiran's brother, Haleema's husband.
Erum Akhtar as Haleema: Ujala's elder sister, Bakhtiyaar's wife.
Beena Chaudhary as Nusrat Ara(Deceased): Kiran and Bakhtiyaar's mother, Haleema's mother-in-law, in spite of aware of her daughter’s nature and doesn’t stop her from wrongdoing.
Fazyla Lashari as Naveen(Deceased): Faiza, Zarbab and Zohaib's younger sister.
Fahima Awan as Faiza: Zarbab, Zohaib and Naveen's elder sister, married to Yawar.
Hashim Butt as Wajahat Hussain: Zarbab, Faiza, Zohaib and Naveen's father.
Seemi Pasha as Kausar Shamshaad: Zarbab, Faiza, Zohaib and Naveen's mother.
Parveen Akbar as Fazeelat aka Bee Jaan: Haleema and Ujala maternal grandmother, Kiran and Bakhtiyaar's grandmother.
Yasir Shoro as Rizwan(Deceased): flirty loafer and gambler, desperate in courting Ujala. 
Mizna Waqas as Rakhshanda: Rizwan's elder greedy sister.
Nida Khan as Nawaal: Zohaib's wife, a contemporary brattish girl moved from UK to Pakistan.
Raeed Muhammad Alam as Kamran: Kiran's friend from past, tried to harass Naveen.
Esha Noor as Ayesha: Zarbab's second wife.
Memoona Mughal as Maira: Kiran's neighbor when she moved to apartment after being released from Jail on bail.
Babar Khan as Ibrar: a greedy guy, Maira's brother, Kiran's second husband.
Mubasira Khanam as Rizwan and Rakhshanda's mother, Ujala's mother-in-law.
Farah Nadeem as Raheela: Nawaal's mother.
Syed Shams Hussain as Yawar: Faiza's husband.
Birjees Farooqui as Yawar's mother: Faiza's mother-in-law.
Majida Hameed as Madam Shahwaar: principal of school where Ujala teaches.
Fareeda Shabbir as Maira and Ibrar's mother. 
Yasir Alam as Tony: Nawaal's cousin and friend.
Malaika Riaz as Washma: Kiran's friend. At her wedding, Zarbaab met Kiran for the first time.
Maria Gul Jan as Shanzay: Naveen's university friend.
Sheharyar Ghazali as Farhan Sethi: Zohaib's friend, Ujala's employee.
Hassan Shah as Farrukh: Ibrar's friend, involved in fraud with him.
Ayat Arif (child star) as Naveen: Zohaib and Nawaal's daughter.
Emaan Khan (child star) as Kashaf: Zarbaab and Kiran's daughter.
Sheharyar Ahmed as Ahad: Zarbab and Kiran's son.

Guest Appearance
Mirza Rizwan Baig: flirty and wealthy guy.
Talia Jan as Fariha: Naveen's friend, Kiran's junior in college.
Hanif Mohammad as Shams: Nawaal's father.
Faisal Naqvi as Asim: Shahwaar's son, Faiza's second husband.
Anees Alam as Rickshaw driver
Faysal Shahzad as Raju: Kamran's friend, involved in his scheme to trap and harass Naveen.
Shahzad Mukhtar as Ayesha's father.
Noman Habib as Kashan Ahmed: fraudster wanted to trap Kiran.
Ramsha Akmal as Farhana: Ibrar's first wife.

Reception
The serial emerged as one of the highest rated dramas on Pakistani television in terms of Trps for the year 2022. However, it was criticized for its repeated and flashback scenes.

References

External Links

2022 Pakistani television series debuts
2022 Pakistani television series endings
Geo TV original programming